Satyendra Nath Ray is an Indian politician from Bharatiya Janata Party. In May 2021, he was elected as a member of the West Bengal Legislative Assembly from Gangarampur (constituency). He defeated Goutam Das of All India Trinamool Congress by 4,592 votes in 2021 West Bengal Assembly election. Previously, he was member of the All India Trinamool Congress and won the same seat in 2011 West Bengal Assembly election.

References 

Living people
Year of birth missing (living people)
21st-century Indian politicians
People from Darjeeling district
Bharatiya Janata Party politicians from West Bengal
Trinamool Congress politicians
West Bengal MLAs 2021–2026
West Bengal MLAs 2011–2016
People from Dakshin Dinajpur district